Savli is one of the 182 Legislative Assembly constituencies of Gujarat state in India. It is part of Vadodara district.

List of segments
This assembly seat represents the following segments,

 Savli Town
 Vadodara Taluka Villages – Dodka, Rayaka, Sankarda, Vasna-Kotariya, Fajalpur (Sankarda)
 Savli Taluka Villages - Gutardi, Nhara, Gulabpura (Shihora), Ajabpura, Amarapura, Kalupura, Parthampura (Shihora), Gokalpura Ganeshpura, Zumkha, Dipapura, Ankaliya, Dhantej, Narpura, Mevli, Vitoj, Samantpura, Gangadiyapura, Dungripura (Shihora), Rasawadi, Lachhanpura, Rupankui, Kanoda, Rasulpur, Dungrapura, Tulsipura, Kamalpura, Vasanpura, Muval, Sardarpura, Poicha (Kanoda), Mevaliapura, Wankaner, Javla, Charanpura, Moti Bhadol, Vadiya(K), Mal Ankaliya, Kambola, Khakhariya, Singaniya, Mudhela, Ghantiyal, Ranipura (Samlaya), Nani Bhadol, Samlaya, Sherpura, Karachiya, Gothada, Ranchhodpura, Bahidhara Alias Natvarnagar, Bhadarva, Parthampura (Bhadarva), Jalampura, Khandi, Poicha (Raniya), Raniya, Mahapura, Ranipura(B), Namisara, Bautha, Lasundra, Pasva, Motipura, Pratapnagar, Gangadiya, Lotna, Sadra, Adalwada, Vadadala, Chandranagar, Subhelav, Paldi, Tundav, Anjesar, Moksi, Kunpad, Manjusar, Lamdapura, Zumkal, Alindra, Pilol, Indrad, Khokhar, Vemar, Garadhiya, Dhanora, Haripura,
 Desar Taluka Villages - Tulsigam,  Vachchhesar,  Jambu Goral,  Varsada, Waghpura,  Tansiya, Himmatpura, Dungripura(I), Intvad,  Nani Varnoli (Vanto), Desar,  Valavav, Vejpur,  Jesar Gopari, Vaktapura,  Kadachhala, Manekla, Moti Varnoli, Nani Varnoli, Chhalier, Vankaneda, Ghemalpura, Dolatpura, Pipalchhat Vanto, Rampuri-Narpuri, Vadiya (Pandu), Rajupura, Limdanu Muvadu, Kalyan Patelnu Muvadu, Rajpur, Pratappura, Shihora, Gorsan, Vaghanu Muvadu, Raipura Chhatrapura, Bhila, Pandu, Pipalchhat, Sanpiya, Mokampura, Kaslapura, Vansiya, Ghanta, Andrakhiya, Limdi, Latva, Vav, Sandhasal,

Members of Legislative Assembly

Election results

2022

2017

2012

See also
List of constituencies of Gujarat Legislative Assembly
Gujarat Legislative Assembly

References

External links
 

Assembly constituencies of Gujarat
Vadodara district